General elections were held in Honduras between 26 and 28 October 1919. Rafael López Gutiérrez of the Liberal Party won the presidential election with 81% of the vote.

Results

President

Vice President

References

Bibliography
Bardales B., Rafael. Historia del Partido Nacional de Honduras. Tegucigalpa: Servicopiax Editores. 1980.
Durón, Rómulo. Bosquejo histórico de Honduras. Tegucigalpa: Baktun Editorial. Third edition. 1982. 
Euraque, Darío A. Reinterpreting the banana republic: region and state in Honduras, 1870-1972. Chapel Hill: The University of North Carolina Press. 1996.
Haggerty, Richard and Richard Millet. “Historical setting.” Merrill, Tim L., ed. 1995. Honduras: a country study. Washington, D.C.: Federal Research Division, Library of Congress.
Posas, Mario and Rafael del Cid. La construcción del sector público y del estado nacional en Honduras (1876–1979). San José: EDUCA. Second edition. 1983. 
Stokes, William S. Honduras: an area study in government. Madison: University of Wisconsin Press. 1950. 

Elections in Honduras
Honduras
General
Presidential elections in Honduras
Honduras
Election and referendum articles with incomplete results